NBC 21 may refer to one of the following television stations in the United States:

KNBN in Rapid City, South Dakota
KNPG-LD in St. Joseph, Missouri
KQTV/KVFD-TV in Fort Dodge, Iowa (formerly with NBC from 1953 to 1977; now defunct)
KTVZ in Bend, Oregon
WFMJ-TV in Youngstown, Ohio
WPTA-DT2, a digital channel of WPTA in Fort Wayne, Indiana